Vyšehrad is a Prague Metro station on Line C, located at the south end of Nusle Bridge.

The station was opened on 9 May 1974 with the first section of Prague Metro, between Sokolovská and Kačerov. The station serves Vyšehrad and was formerly known as Gottwaldova (the previous working name was "Nuselský most"). It is near the Prague Congress Centre and the Corinthia Hotel Tower. Vyšehrad castle is also accessible from this station on foot.

References

Prague Metro stations
Railway stations opened in 1974
1974 establishments in Czechoslovakia
Railway stations in the Czech Republic opened in the 20th century